Pircher Oberland Spa is an Italian company operating in the field of sustainable timber construction, DIY and garden furnishings. It was founded in 1928 by Josef Pircher and has been subsequently managemed by the Pircher family. In 2010, it was awarded the Red Dot Design Award for its modular wooden construction system, Planit.

Company history
Pircher Oberland Spa was founded by Josef Pircher in 1928, who opened a sawmill in Toblach, in the northern Italian province of South Tyrol. From 1956 he was supported by his son Reinhard, who later on would enlarge and diversify the company. , the company remains under the management of the Pircher Family.

In 1968, the company produced its first original French sauna, and in 1978 it entered the DIY market with its "Holzmarkt" product line. The warehouse and logistics of Holzmarkt products moved to Bondeno di Gonzaga in 1990. Lamellar wooden beams have been produced since 1992. In 2003, a new logistics and CRM centre open in Rolo. The same year Reinhard Pircher died, and his son Christian took over the company management. As of 2010, the company has 178 employers and a portfolio of 20,000 products, produced in five different factories in Italy. The company philosophy is based on a respect for nature.

Planit
In 2010, Pircher Overland Spa was awarded the Red Dot Design Award for its modular wooden construction system, Planit. Planit is a modular prefabricated system, made of natural wood, and planned by Studio Bestetti e Associati of Milan. Planit modules have three different measures which can be combined in different ways to create different architectural compositions that can serve as civil residences as well as production sites. The principal materials used are wood and glass; its structure allows a thermal and an acoustic isolation. The product innovation lies in the evolution of the concept of living which acquires another connotation, namely a more responsible and sustainability-oriented way of life.

See also 

List of Italian companies

External links
Pircher web site

Manufacturing companies of Italy
Furniture companies of Italy
Manufacturing companies established in 1928
1928 establishments in Italy
Italian brands